A bay is a basic unit of library shelving.

In modern practice, books are shelved from the top shelf to the bottom shelf in each bay, but in historic libraries where the shelves in a bay are not adjustable, it is common for the lower shelves to be spaced to accommodate taller books, with each book having a designated location.

Rows consist of a number of bays, either single-sided or double-sided, connected to each other. The standard length of a row is five to six bays, but it is not uncommon to find rows seven bays wide or even wider. In some countries, a row is referred to as a 'stack' or a 'range'.

References

Furniture